Zoltán Fábri (15 October 1917 – 23 August 1994) was a Hungarian film director and screenwriter. His films The Boys of Paul Street (1969) and Hungarians (1978) were nominated for the Academy Award for Best Foreign Language Film. His 1965 film Twenty Hours shared the Grand Prix with War and Peace at the 4th Moscow International Film Festival. His 1969 film The Toth Family was entered into the 7th Moscow International Film Festival. His 1975 film 141 Minutes from the Unfinished Sentence was entered into the 9th Moscow International Film Festival, where he won a Special Prize for Directing.

Life and career 
Fábri wanted to become an artist from an early age on. He studied painting and graduated at the Hungarian College of Fine Arts. He began working in the Hungarian film industry in 1950 as a production designer. He directed his first film Vihar (Storm) in 1951. He became an internationally acclaimed director with his third feature Körhinta (Merry Go-Round) in 1956. He continued directing and writing until the early 1980s. After his retirement from the film industry Fábri taught on the Hungarian University of Theatrical and Film Arts. In his last years he wrote screenplays; they were never made. Fábri was also the president of the Hungarian Film Artist Union from 1959 to 1981.

Fábri's style of filmmaking can be described mainly as "classical", using academic techniques of art filmmaking. His greatest influences were the Italian Neorealism and French Poetic Realism. He experimented with narrative and flashback techniques for a while in the 1960s (in his films Nappali sötétség and Húsz óra) and his 1976 film Az ötödik pecsét contains some highly surrealist scenes, but overall he never used the mannerisms of modernist film in his works. For this reason the Kádár regime favored Fábri over more controversial and experimental directors like Miklós Jancsó. The film won the Golden Prize at the 10th Moscow International Film Festival and was entered into the 27th Berlin International Film Festival.

At the 11th Moscow International Film Festival in 1979, he was awarded with the Honorable Prize for the contribution to cinema.

He was known as a perfectionist who wrote, drawn and choreographed every scene to the most precise detail months before production began and never improvised anything. His reputation as a rigid, tyrannical director was somewhat contradicted by his friendly and kind behaviour towards the British and American child actors on the set of The Boys of Paul Street.

Fábri made nearly all of his films based on literary material (novels or short stories) and wrote the screenplays himself. His constant theme was the question of humanity. Many of his films are set in or around World War II. Two of his frequent collaborators were actress Mari Törőcsik and cinematographer György Illés. In 1969 he played the role of prosecuted statesman Zoltán Dániel in his friend Péter Bacsó's cult satire, A tanú (The Witness) as his sole acting job.

Fábri died in a heart attack at the age of 76 in 1994. His legal successor is Peter Fabri (b. 1985).

Filmography

References

External links

1917 births
1994 deaths
Hungarian film directors
Male screenwriters
Hungarian male writers
Burials at Farkasréti Cemetery
Film people from Budapest
20th-century Hungarian screenwriters